The Minister-President of the Saarland, is the head of government of the German state of the Saarland. The position was created in 1946. The current Minister President is Anke Rehlinger, heading a  Social Democratic Party government. Rehlinger succeeded Tobias Hans following the 2022 Saarland state election. 

After World War II, the Saarland became a French protectorate. With the negative result of the 1955 Saar Statute referendum, the Saarland joined the Federal Republic of Germany as a state on 1 January 1957. Saarland used its own currency, the Saar franc, and postage stamps issued specially for the territory until 1959.

The office of the Minister President is known as the State Chancellery, and is located in the capital of Saarbrücken, along with the rest of the cabinet departments.

List
Political party:

See also
Saarland
Politics of Saarland
Landtag of Saarland

Ministers-President
 
Saarland
Min